Dar Djaït is an old palace of the Medina of Tunis. It is located in the Street of Sidi ben Arous.

History 
The family of Djaït authentic of Yemen. They were a noble family of Tunisia, and they moved to Tunisia during the reign of Mourad III Bey.

The palace was built during the 19th century. Many reparations were done during the second half of the 20th century, and it was inhabited by the Djaït family until 2008.

Architecture 
The front door of the entrance leads to a staircase made of white marble.

References 

Palaces in the medina of Tunis